Brad Seely (born September 6, 1956) is a former American football coach.

Playing career
Seely attended South Dakota State University, where he played football and was an All-Conference offensive lineman. He earned degrees in both economics and physical education while there.

Coaching career

College
Seely began his college coaching career in 1978 with his alma mater South Dakota State. He then moved to Colorado State University as a graduate assistant in 1979 and was promoted to offensive line coach in 1979. Seely also spent a year in 1981 with current Patriots offensive line coach Dante Scarnecchia at Southern Methodist University as an assistant offensive line coach. In 1982, Seely was an offensive line coach for North Carolina State University, then moved to University of the Pacific in the same capacity for 1983. In 1984, Seely rounded out his college career with 5 years at Oklahoma State, coaching an offensive line that led Barry Sanders to the 1988 Heisman Trophy.

NFL
Seely made the jump to the professional level in 1989, working as the tight ends and special teams coach for the Indianapolis Colts through 1993. He then spent the 1994 season with the New York Jets as their special teams coach. In 1995, Seely began a 4-year stint with the Carolina Panthers also as their special teams coach, winning the NFL Special Teams Coach of the Year Award in 1996. He joined the Patriots on January 27, 1999. Following 10 seasons with the Patriots as their special teams coach under Pete Carroll and Bill Belichick, Seely joined former Patriots assistant Eric Mangini's coaching staff in Cleveland as their assistant head coach and special teams coach in 2009. Beginning in 2011, he is Special Teams Coordinator and Assistant Head Coach with the San Francisco 49ers. He was hired by the Raiders on January 20, 2015. On January 17, 2018 Seely was hired by the Houston Texans as the Special Teams Coordinator. On June 5, 2020, Seely announced his retirement from coaching.

Personal life
Seely and his wife, Patricia, have three daughters, Sarah, Hannah, and Brynn.

References

External links
 Oakland Raiders bio
 New England Patriots biography

1956 births
Living people
People from Vinton, Iowa
American football offensive linemen
South Dakota State Jackrabbits football players
Colorado State Rams football coaches
SMU Mustangs football coaches
NC State Wolfpack football coaches
Pacific Tigers football coaches
Oklahoma State Cowboys football coaches
Houston Texans coaches
San Francisco 49ers coaches
Oakland Raiders coaches
Indianapolis Colts coaches
New York Jets coaches
Carolina Panthers coaches
New England Patriots coaches
Cleveland Browns coaches